Philip Sang'ka Marmo (29 December 1951) is a Tanzanian politician and diplomat.

References

1951 births
Living people
Ambassadors of Tanzania to China
Ambassadors of Tanzania to Germany
Tanzanian MPs 2000–2005
Tanzanian MPs 2005–2010
University of Dar es Salaam alumni